The 2022–23 NCAA football bowl games were a series of college football games played to complete the 2022 NCAA Division I FBS football season. Team-competitive games began in mid-December and concluded with the 2023 College Football Playoff National Championship on January 9, 2023, which was won by the Georgia Bulldogs. The all-star portion of the schedule began on January 14 and concluded on February 25, 2023.

Schedule
The schedule for the 2022–23 bowl games is below. All times are EST (UTC−5). Note that Division II bowls and Division III bowls are not included here. The bowl schedule was released May 26, 2022.

College Football Playoff and National Championship Game
The College Football Playoff system is used to determine a national championship of Division I FBS college football. A 13-member committee of experts ranked the top 25 teams in the nation after each of the last seven weeks of the regular season. The top four teams in the final ranking are then seeded in a single-elimination semifinal round, with the winners advancing to the National Championship game.

The semifinal games for the 2022 season were the Fiesta Bowl and the Peach Bowl. Both were played on December 31, 2022, as part of a yearly rotation of three pairs of two bowls, commonly referred to as the New Year's Six bowl games. The winners advanced to the 2023 College Football Playoff National Championship on January 9, 2023.

Each of the games in the following table was televised by ESPN.

Non CFP bowl games

Bowl changes
 The Bahamas Bowl is now sponsored by HomeTown Lenders.
 The game formerly known as the Outback Bowl was renamed as the ReliaQuest Bowl, following the end of sponsorship by Outback Steakhouse.
 The Cure Bowl is now sponsored by Duluth Trading Company.
 The Fiesta Bowl is now sponsored by Vrbo.
 The Pinstripe Bowl is now sponsored by Bad Boy Mowers.
The Citrus Bowl is now sponsored by Kellogg's through its Cheez-It brand.
The Frisco Football Classic will not be taking place this year, as it was a temporary replacement to accommodate all 84 bowl-eligible teams.

Bowl schedule
Rankings are per the final CFP rankings that were released on December 4.

Source:

FCS bowl game
The Football Championship Subdivision (FCS) has one bowl game. The FCS also has a postseason bracket tournament that culminates in the 2023 NCAA Division I Football Championship Game.

All-star games
Each of these games features college seniors, or players whose college football eligibility is ending, who are individually invited by game organizers. These games are scheduled to follow the team-competitive bowls, to allow players selected from bowl teams to participate. The all-star games may include some players from non-FBS programs.

Team selections

CFP top 25 standings and bowl games

The College Football Playoff (CFP) selection committee announced its final team rankings for the season on December 4, 2022. It was the ninth season of the CFP era.  It was the first time that two Big Ten teams were in the semifinals, and the first time that neither Alabama nor Clemson were in the semifinals.

Conference champions' bowl games
Ranks are per the final CFP rankings, released on December 4, with win–loss records at that time.  One bowl will feature a matchup of conference champions – the Cure Bowl. Champions of the Power Five conferences were assured of a spot in a New Year's Six bowl game.

Bowl-eligible teams 
Generally, a team must have at least six wins to be considered bowl eligible, with at least five of those wins being against FBS opponents. The College Football Playoff semifinal games are determined based on the top four seeds in the playoff committee's final rankings. The remainder of the bowl eligible teams are selected by each respective bowl based on conference tie-ins, order of selection, match-up considerations, and other factors.

ACC (9): Clemson, Duke, Florida State, Louisville, NC State, North Carolina, Pittsburgh, Syracuse, Wake Forest
American (7): Cincinnati, East Carolina, Houston, Memphis, SMU, Tulane, UCF
Big Ten (9): Illinois, Iowa, Maryland, Michigan, Minnesota, Ohio State, Penn State, Purdue, Wisconsin
Big 12 (8): Baylor, Kansas, Kansas State, Oklahoma, Oklahoma State, TCU, Texas, Texas Tech
C–USA (6): Middle Tennessee, North Texas, Rice, UAB, UTSA, Western Kentucky
MAC (6): Bowling Green, Buffalo, Eastern Michigan, Miami (OH), Ohio, Toledo 
Mountain West (7): Air Force, Boise State, Fresno State, San Diego State, San Jose State, Utah State, Wyoming
Pac-12 (7): Oregon, Oregon State, UCLA, USC, Utah, Washington, Washington State
SEC (11): Alabama, Arkansas, Florida, Georgia, Kentucky, LSU, Mississippi State, Missouri, Ole Miss, South Carolina, Tennessee
Sun Belt (7): Coastal Carolina, Georgia Southern, Louisiana, Marshall, South Alabama, Southern Miss, Troy
Independent (5): BYU, Liberty, New Mexico State, Notre Dame, UConn
Number of bowl berths available: 82Number of bowl-eligible teams: 80Number of conditional bowl-eligible teams: 1 (New Mexico State) 
Number of teams qualified by APR: 1 (Rice)

Bowl-ineligible teams 
ACC (5): Boston College, Georgia Tech, Miami (FL), Virginia, Virginia Tech
American (4): Navy, South Florida, Temple, Tulsa 
Big Ten (5): Indiana, Michigan State, Nebraska, Northwestern, Rutgers
Big 12 (2): Iowa State, West Virginia
C–USA (5): Charlotte, FIU, Florida Atlantic, Louisiana Tech, UTEP
MAC (6): Akron, Ball State, Central Michigan, Kent State, Northern Illinois, Western Michigan
Mountain West (5): Colorado State, Hawaii, Nevada, New Mexico, UNLV
Pac-12 (5): Arizona, Arizona State, California, Colorado, Stanford
SEC (3): Auburn, Texas A&M, Vanderbilt
Sun Belt (7): Appalachian State, Arkansas State, Georgia State, James Madison, Louisiana–Monroe, Old Dominion, Texas State
Independent (2): Army, UMass

Number of bowl-ineligible teams: 49

Venues
A total of thirty-seven venues will be utilized, with seven of them in particular for the CFP National Championship and New Year's Six (NY6).  Prestige and capacity of venues usually increases as the schedule progresses towards to NY6 bowls and the national championship, in large part due to scheduling Top 25 teams late into the bowl games' time frame, while bowl games before Christmas Day typically involve schools in Group of Five conferences and FBS Independents (with the exception of Notre Dame due to being a member of the ACC in all other sports except for men's hockey which competes in the Big Ten).  Televising at the venues of bowl games is largely run by ESPN and joint networks (ABC & ESPN2), with only three bowl games run by a non-affiliated network (Holiday Bowl on Fox, Sun Bowl on CBS and Arizona Bowl on Barstool Sports). With the exception of the Bahamas Bowl in The Bahamas, all bowls will be played within the United States.

CFP bowls

The College Football Playoff committee elected to continue with the six venues for this postseason—including two as the semifinals for the 2023 College Football Playoff National Championship―as outlined below:

 State Farm Stadium in Glendale: Venue for the 2022 Fiesta Bowl that featured one of the semi-final pairings.
 Mercedes-Benz Stadium in Atlanta: Venue for the 2022 Peach Bowl that featured one of the semi-final pairings.
 AT&T Stadium in Arlington: Venue for the 2023 Cotton Bowl Classic that featured two of the four highest non-Top 4 and non-NY6 bid conference affiliated.
 Hard Rock Stadium in Miami Gardens: Venue for the 2022 Orange Bowl that featured two of the four highest non-Top 4 and non-NY6 bid conference affiliated.
 Rose Bowl in Pasadena: Venue for the 2023 Rose Bowl that featured the highest non-top 4 conference finishers from the Big Ten and Pac-12.
 Caesars Superdome in New Orleans: Venue for the 2022 Sugar Bowl that featured the highest non-top 4 conference finishers from the SEC and Big 12.
 SoFi Stadium in Inglewood (Los Angeles): Venue for the 2023 College Football Playoff National Championship that featured the winners of both semi-finals.

Venues hosting multiple bowls
The following venues were selected to host more than one bowl game or all-star game:
 Allegiant Stadium (Las Vegas area): Las Vegas Bowl, East–West Shrine Bowl
 Caesars Superdome (New Orleans): New Orleans Bowl, Sugar Bowl
 Camping World Stadium (Orlando): Cheez-It Bowl, Citrus Bowl, Tropical Bowl
 Hancock Whitney Stadium (Mobile): LendingTree Bowl, Senior Bowl
 Mercedes-Benz Stadium (Atlanta): Peach Bowl, Celebration Bowl
 Raymond James Stadium (Tampa): Gasparilla Bowl, ReliaQuest Bowl
 Rose Bowl (Pasadena, California): Rose Bowl, NFLPA Collegiate Bowl
 SoFi Stadium (Los Angeles area): LA Bowl, National Championship
 denotes an all-star game

 denotes an FCS bowl game

Notes

References

Further reading

External links
 College Football Playoff website

 

 
b